Wilson Gap, originally known as  Gregory's Gap, is a wind gap in the Blue Ridge Mountain, located on the border of Loudoun County, Virginia and Jefferson County, West Virginia.  The Appalachian Trail crosses the gap.

The  gap once served as a thoroughfare between Round Hill, the former terminus of the Washington and Old Dominion Railroad in western Loudoun, and the resort communities of Shannondale and Mountain Mission in Jefferson County via the Wilson Gap Road.  
The resorts fell victim to the Great Depression and the upper reaches of Wilson Gap Road became impassable to vehicular traffic by the outbreak of World War II.  Though no longer maintained as a public road, the old road bed can still be found by the discerning hiker.

References

Landforms of Loudoun County, Virginia
Landforms of Jefferson County, West Virginia
Wind gaps of Virginia
Valleys of West Virginia
Blue Ridge Mountains
Appalachian Trail
Wind gaps of the United States